Winter Haven is a city in Polk County, Florida, United States. It is fifty-one miles east of Tampa. The population was 49,219 at the 2020 census. According to the U.S. Census Bureau's 2019 estimates, this city had a population of 44,955, making it the second most populated city in Polk County. It is a principal city of the Lakeland-Winter Haven, Florida Metropolitan Statistical Area.

History

Pre-history
The Timucua and the Calusa were the earliest known inhabitants of the land that would become Winter Haven. Both of these groups were deeply affected by war and disease from the Spanish conquest of Florida in the early 1500s. The Timucua were particularly affected by the expedition of Hernando de Soto. By the 19th century, both these groups no longer existed. During these expeditions the Spanish explorers claimed the entire peninsula of Florida for the Spanish monarchy

In the 19th century the Creek and the Seminole were known to live and hunt in this area. During the Seminole Wars the Seminole leader, Chipco, and his followers were known to live in the Winter Haven area. Several small skirmishes during the war were fought in and around Winter Haven.

19th century
In 1819, after the signing of the Adams-Onís Treaty, the United States gained control of Florida. The first American or European settlers in the area were encouraged to settle there by the Armed Occupation Act of 1842.

During the 1840s and 1850s, the United States government conducted the first surveys of the area. Henry Washington conducted the first survey of the area in 1843. In 1849, Dr. John Westcott completed an extensive survey of the area, including mapping many of the local lakes. The first maps of the area were published by the United States government in 1854. In 1883, Henry Haines working for Henry Plant and the Plant System, successfully built the first railroad across Polk County, passing just north of Winter Haven. Lake Haines, in Winter Haven, was named after Haines, who served as a colonel in the Confederate States Army.

The arrival of the railroad created the first real growth in area. The area was platted in 1884 and would first be known as Harris Corners. This name was in reference to F.A.K. Harris, who opened the first mercantile store in the area around this time. The name Winter Haven was later suggested, in reference to the area's pleasant climate.

Early 20th century
By the end of the century, the population grew to approximately 400 and in 1911, the City of Winter Haven was incorporated. The Chain of Lakes canals were begun in 1915. The first Florida boom took place in the 1920s as towns sprang up all over the peninsula. Florida's potential as a place to live and a place to visit was first realized in the 1920s, but the Great Depression slowed growth until after World War II. Winter Haven Hospital was founded in 1926 and has been in the city ever since.

During this period, the population of Winter Haven began to grow substantially. Many beautiful single-family homes were built in Winter Haven at this time in the colonial revival style. Over 50 these homes are on the National Register of Historic Places today. They are noted for their architectural style and grace. Most of these historic homes are located in the Interlaken neighborhood. There are four historic districts in Winter Haven. They are Interlaken, Pope Avenue, Winter Haven Heights, and the downtown area.

Growth and development
In 1930, George W. Jenkins opened the first Publix supermarket in Winter Haven. His second store and the first stand-alone Publix store, was a 27 ft by 65 ft building at 199 West Central Avenue, opened in 1935, which exists today as the Regenerations thrift store. During the 1930s and 1940s, citrus magnate, John A. Snively operated one of the largest fruit packing plants in the world in Winter Haven.

Another defining event in Winter Haven was the opening of Cypress Gardens in 1936 by Dick Pope Sr. and his wife, Julie Pope. They first got the idea for the park from a Good Housekeeping magazine that they were reading. By the 1950s, Cypress Gardens was nationally famous. It featured a beautiful botanical garden, water skiing shows, and a staff of southern belles. Many famous celebrities of that time visited the park, including Elvis Presley, Frank Sinatra, Betty Grable, and King Hussein of Jordan. In the 1980s, the Anheuser-Busch corporation purchased the park. They continued to operate the park until 1995. After that, the park struggled, finally closing for good in 2009. On January 21, 2010, the site of Cypress Gardens was formally announced as the selected location for the Legoland Florida theme park, which opened on October 15, 2011. Legoland Florida has successfully retained some of the tradition and history of the original site, including part of the original botanical garden and a water ski show.

Winter Haven features  many buildings designed by the architect Gene Leedy, one of the founders of the Sarasota School of Architecture. Regency Medical Center, which is Winter Haven Hospital's women's hospital, was built in 1987. Some of Leedy’s structures are part of the Downtown Winter Haven Historic District.

The Orange Dome, located near the corner of Cypress Gardens Blvd and US Hwy 17, was built in 1964. For 48 years, it hosted the annual Citrus Festival and other civic affairs. In February 2012, the Orange Dome was demolished to make way for The Landings, a proposed $150 million mixed-use development that was intended to include high-end retail stores, restaurants, hotels, apartments and a new movie theater to be built at the Chain of Lakes Complex. However, after the construction of three fast food chain stores, the project collapsed. , the developer and the city were in negotiations to determine the future of the site.

Pughsville
Pughsville was a neighborhood of Winter Haven where African Americans built a community after the Civil War. A historical marker on Highway 17 at Avenue O commemorates the community. According to the marker, Pughsville was one of Winter Haven's earliest neighborhoods and was settled by African Americans who cleared the land in the southwest section of the city.

Pughsville was named for an early black pioneer, Reverend Charles Pugh, who was a founder of one of Zion Hill Missionary Baptist Church. Pughsville was also home to Bethel A.M.E., St. Paul Holiness, and Church of Christ. The community was most active from the 1900s until the 1950s and had an African-American school, social halls, small grocery stores, and restaurants where some residents worked. Others worked in the citrus industry or in state or federal jobs. Pughsville produced Winter Haven's first African-American commissioner and mayor Lemuel Geathers, medical doctor, fire fighter and postal worker. The community declined in the late 1970s as larger commercial establishments began arriving in the area.

Geography

Winter Haven is located within the Central Florida Highlands area of the Atlantic coastal plain with a terrain consisting of flatland interspersed with gently rolling hills. The city is located at the headwaters of the Peace River.

Lakes
Winter Haven has 50 lakes within its borders, including its famous Chain of Lakes. The lakes are by far the city's most distinctive feature. Winter Haven bills itself as "The Chain of Lakes City". The city has two prominent chains of lakes; the northern chain has nine lakes interconnected by a series of canals. The southern chain features sixteen lakes interconnected by a series of canals. The southern chain has several prominent lakes, including Lake Eloise, Lake Howard, and Lake Lulu. In 2011, after six years of construction and political infighting, Winter Haven opened a canal lock system connecting the two chains. Most of the lakes in Winter Haven formed in a similar fashion to sinkholes, through dissolving of the limestone ground. These types of lakes are called "solution lakes". The lakes in Winter Haven teem with life, including alligators, bald eagles, great blue herons, and more. The Winter Haven lakes are a world-renowned spot for bass fishing.

Climate

Winter Haven is located in the humid subtropical zone (Köppen climate classification: Cfa). The city averages  of rain per year. The months of June, July, August, and September, which includes the height of the Atlantic hurricane season, are by far the rainiest time of the year. Those four months, which average  of rain, account for more than half of the annual rainfall. Frost occur about once per year on average.

Demographics

As of the 2010 census, Winter Haven was 55.6% white, 28.2% black, 12.5% Hispanic, 2.5% Asian.
As of the census of 2000, there were 26,487 people, 11,833 households, and 6,934 families residing in the city.

There were 11,833 households, out of which 21.6% had children under the age of 18 living with them, 42.1% were married couples living together, 12.8% had a female householder with no husband present, and 41.4% were non-families. 36.0% of all households were made up of individuals, and 18.9% had someone living alone who was 65 years of age or older. The average household size was 2.17 and the average family size was 2.81.

In the city the population was spread out, with 20.9% under the age of 18, 6.8% from 18 to 24, 23.5% from 25 to 44, 21.4% from 45 to 64, and 27.4% who were 65 years of age or older. The median age was 44 years. For every 100 females, there were 85.1 males. For every 100 females age 18 and over, there were 81.2 males.

The median income for a household in the city was $31,884, and the median income for a family was $39,657. Males had a median income of $30,943 versus $21,812 for females. The per capita income for the city was $20,383. About 10.5% of families and 15.0% of the population were below the poverty line, including 24.2% of those under age 18 and 7.9% of those age 65 or over.

Sports

Three-time Olympic gold medal swimmer, Rowdy Gaines, and Olympic gold medal sprinter, Kenneth Brokenburr both grew up in Winter Haven. Four-time NBA all-star and Olympic gold medalist guard, Otis Birdsong, also grew up in Winter Haven. Welterweight boxing champion, Andre Berto, is another famous athlete who grew up in Winter Haven.

Winter Haven has many successful sports programs, both recreational and competitive, serving the youth in the community. Winter Haven High School has won several state and district championships in various sports, including Girls Varsity Basketball State Championship in 2005, 2007, 2016, and 2017.

With so many lakes, Winter Haven is a location for fresh water fishing. The two sports for which Winter Haven is best known are water skiing and baseball.

Water skiing history
Winter Haven has played a major role in the development and growth of water skiing as a sport. Dick Pope Sr. used water skiing as a way to promote his Cypress Gardens theme park starting in the 1930s, and water ski shows soon became a staple of entertainment at the park. He was also the first person to complete a jump on water skis, jumping over a wooden ramp in 1928, for a distance of 25 feet. He pioneered a number of other water skiing tricks, including the water ski human pyramid, as part of an effort to develop his shows at Cypress Gardens. His son, Dick Pope Jr. popularized barefoot water skiing, bringing early pioneers such as Don Thomson to Cypress gardens to develop novel acts such as tumble turns, backwards barefooting, front to back and beach starts to please the theme park crowds.

Winter Haven is connected to 10 members of the Water Ski Hall of Fame, more than any other city in the world. These include Dick Pope Sr., Dick Pope Jr., and Ricky McCormick. George A. "Banana George" Blair, who still holds several water ski world records, was first introduced to the sport while visiting Winter Haven in the 1950s. Winter Haven has many lakes, including its famous chain of lakes, that are perfect for water skiing. Today, several successful ski schools, for both water skiing and barefoot skiing, make their home there. Every day, all year round, water skiers can be seen practicing their sport on the lakes around town.

Spring training baseball
Winter Haven was a Major League Baseball Spring Training site for many years, first at Denison Field and later at Chain of Lakes Park. Great baseball players who played spring training baseball in Winter Haven included Jimmie Foxx, Lou Gehrig, Willie Mays, Roberto Clemente, Johnny Bench, and Hank Aaron.

In 1928, the Philadelphia Phillies were the first Major League Baseball team to call Winter Haven their spring-home. The Phillies played at Denison Field, which featured a large, covered wooden grandstand. The Phillies played spring training games there until 1938. In 1940, the New York Giants did one season there. After baseball left Denison, the field was donated to the city for the benefit of youth athletics. The stadium was rebuilt in 1947 with a larger grandstand and in use today for college and high school football, soccer, track and field, and other events.

In 1966, the Boston Red Sox and spring training baseball returned to Winter Haven. The Red Sox played in the newly built Chain of Lakes Park, a state of the art facility at that time. For 26 years, the Red Sox called Winter Haven their spring-home. When the Red Sox left to Fort Myers, Florida in 1992, the city of Winter Haven sought a new Major League Baseball team. Later that year, Hurricane Andrew devastated Homestead, Florida, including the spring training facilities of the Cleveland Indians, and the Indians moved to Winter Haven. In 2008, after failed negotiations with the city to renovate Chain of Lakes Park, the Indians moved into a brand new stadium in Goodyear, Arizona after 16 springs at Chain of Lakes Park.

Chain of Lakes Park today hosts Russ Matt collegiate baseball tournament. The stadium was slated for demolition, and re-development into a shopping center, called the Landings, but those plans are currently stalled.

Education

Public and private schools
Public schools in Winter Haven are operated by Polk County Public Schools.

 Chain of Lakes Collegiate High School
 Cypress Junction Montessori 
 St. Paul's Episcopal School
 Oasis Christian Academy
 Elbert Elementary
 Garden Grove Elementary School
 Garner Elementary School
 Inwood Elementary
 Jewett School of the Arts (Elementary & Middle)
 Lake Shipp Elementary
 John A. Snively Elementary School
 Westwood Middle School
 Jewett Academy Middle School
 Denison Middle School
 Winter Haven Senior High School
 Lake Region High School (Florida)
 Frank E. Brigham Academy Elementary School
 All Saints' Academy (Florida)
 Rachel's School for the Custodial Arts.
 Mark Wilcox Center
 Winter Haven Christian School
 Grace Lutheran School
 St. Joseph Catholic School
 Chain of Lakes Elementary School
 Eagle Lake Elementary
 Wahneta Elementary

Colleges and universities
 Polk State College (PSC)
 Ridge Career Center

Notable people

 Andre Berto, professional welterweight boxer
 Otis Birdsong, professional basketball player
 Kenny Brokenburr, Olympic gold medalist, sprinter
 Marcus Capers, professional basketball player
 Rowdy Gaines, Olympic swimmer
 Chase Johnsey, ballet dancer, Artistic Director of Ballet de Barcelona
 George Kalogridis, President of Walt Disney World Resort
 Gene Leedy, architect
 Lobo, musician
 Trey Mancini, baseball player and cancer survivor
 Jake Owen, musician, singer and songwriter
 Kathleen Parker, author and syndicated columnist
 Larry Parrish, professional baseball player
 Gram Parsons, musician
 Dick Pope Sr., founder of Cypress Gardens
 Dick Pope Jr., CEO of Cypress Gardens and member of the Water Ski Hall of Fame and Museum
 John A. Snively, citrus magnate
 Jim Stafford, entertainer
 Daryl L. Thompson, inventor
 Don Thomson, water skier and navy pilot
 Constance Weldon, tuba player and academic
 Ryan Yarbrough, Tampa Bay Rays baseball pitcher

Media

Winter Haven is part of the Tampa/St. Pete television market, the 13th largest in the country and part of the local Lakeland/Winter Haven radio market, which is the 94th largest in the country.

Since 1911, the Winter Haven News Chief has served the community as the local newspaper. The News Chief also published the Polk County Shopper and ran the site polkonline.com. In 2008, News Chief was taken over by the Lakeland Ledger and operations were merged into that paper's Winter Haven branch.

Transportation

Highways

Major routes through, to, and from Winter Haven include:
  – A major north/south route through Winter Haven, this highway leads northward to Lake Alfred where it joins US 92, and southward to Bartow.
  – This divided highway east of Winter Haven will be a key access road for Legoland Florida in its intersection with Interstate 4 to the north.
  – This key road runs through southern Winter Haven as Cypress Gardens Boulevard, leading westward to Lakeland and the Polk Parkway, by Legoland Florida just east of town, and on eastward to US 27.
  – It cuts through the heart of Winter Haven's downtown as Central Avenue, and leads eastward directly to Dundee at US 27.
  – From northern Winter Haven, SR 544 connects westward to Auburndale, hence its name, Havendale Boulevard, and leads a scenic route eastward toward Haines City.

The streets of downtown Winter Haven are arranged in a grid plan. 1st Street (SR 549) is the north–south axis, with two sets of numbered streets running parallel – one to the east (e.g. 7th St. NE/SE), and one to the west (e.g. 6th St. NW/SW). Central Avenue (SR 542) is the west–east axis, with two sets of lettered avenues similarly running parallel on either side.

Public transit

Local commuter bus service is provided by Winter Haven Area Transit and the Citrus Connection.

Air transport

Intercity rail
Winter Haven has an Amtrak train station served by the Silver Star and Silver Meteor.

Places of interest

Attractions

 Legoland Florida

Healthcare
 Winter Haven Hospital
 Winter Haven Women's Hospital
 Bond Clinic
 Gessler Clinic

Sister city
  Sambuca di Sicilia, Italy (1984), on the occasion of the Water Ski World Cup performed on the lago Arancio, in Sambuca di Sicilia, Italy. The two cities share an association with this sport.

See also
 List of people from Winter Haven, Florida
 Lake Daisy (Florida)
 Camp Mack's River Resort
 River Ranch
 Winter Park, Florida

References

External links

 City of Winter Haven Official Site Portal style website: government, business, library, recreation and more
 Winter Haven News Chief community news
 The Lakeland Ledger newspaper serving Winter Haven and all of Polk County
 City-Data.com Comprehensive statistical data and more about Winter Haven

 
Cities in Florida
Cities in Polk County, Florida
Populated places established in 1884
1884 establishments in Florida